Nawfal is an Arabic name. Notable people with the name include:

Nawfal ibn Khuwaylid, Non-muslim who interacted with prophet Muhammad
Nawfal ibn Abd Manaf, Progenitor of the Banu Nawfal
Waraqah ibn Nawfal, Muhammad's cousin

Arabic masculine given names
Arabic-language surnames